KFIL (1060 AM) is an American commercial radio station licensed to serve Preston, Minnesota.  The station is licensed to broadcast only during daylight hours. Established in 1966 by O.B. Borgen, KFIL is currently owned by Townsquare Media and the broadcast license is held by Townsquare Media Rochester License, LLC.

Programming
KFIL broadcasts a country music format in conjunction with its sister station, KFIL-FM (103.1). The station is a "daytimer", licensed to broadcast from local sunrise to local sunset, to avoid interfering with clear-channel stations KYW in Philadelphia, Pennsylvania, and XEEP in Mexico City. Under a "pre-sunrise authority" granted by the FCC in 2007, the station begins its broadcast day at 6:00 a.m. year-round. KFIL serves Fillmore County and the greater Rochester, Minnesota, area.

As a full service station, non-music programming includes CNN Radio, agriculture news, market reports, and specialized weather reports. KFIL is an affiliate of the Linder Farm Network.  KFIL also broadcasts a tradio program called "Swap Shop" and a community calendar bulletin each weekday.

Weekend programming includes five hours of local church services and other Christian programming on Sunday mornings.  Sports programming on KFIL includes local high school football, high school basketball, high school baseball, and high school softball during the season, KFIL Sports Round-up with sports director Devon Krueger each weekday, and Coaches Corner on Saturday mornings from August through April.

History

Borgen era
This station received its original construction permit on May 21, 1966. It began regular broadcast operations in June 1966, with 500 watts of power. The station was assigned the call sign "KFIL" by the Federal Communications Commission (FCC). The station was originally licensed to serve the community of Preston, Minnesota.

The station was originally owned and operated by KFIL, Inc., with Obed Samuel "O.B." Borgen as president of the corporation. In October 1991, ownership of KFIL, Inc., was transferred to sons Michael S. Borgen and Jeffrey T. Borgen. The station stayed in the Borgen family's control for more than 37 years. Obed Borgen died in July 1999.

Cumulus era
In December 2003, Michael S. Borgen and Jeffrey T. Borgen sold KFIL, Inc., to Cumulus Media through its Cumulus Broadcasting, LLC, subsidiary. The published combined sale price of KFIL, KFIL-FM, and KVGO (through KVGO, Inc.) was $3,000,000.  The deal gained FCC approval on February 5, 2004, and the transaction was consummated on March 30, 2004.  The broadcast license for KFIL was formally transferred from KFIL, Inc., to Cumulus Licensing, LLC, on December 31, 2004.

Longtime KFIL/KFIL-FM air personality Mike Sveen retired from broadcasting in 2007. The former announcer, sports reporter, and Preston, Minnesota, city council member had worked at KFIL/KFIL-FM for more than 25 years.

Townsquare era
On August 30, 2013, a deal was announced in which Townsquare Media would acquire 53 Cumulus stations, including KFIL, for $238 million. The deal was part of Cumulus' acquisition of Dial Global; Townsquare and Dial Global were both controlled by Oaktree Capital Management. The sale to Townsquare was completed on November 14, 2013.

References

External links
KFIL official website

Radio stations in Minnesota
Radio stations established in 1966
Country radio stations in the United States
Fillmore County, Minnesota
Townsquare Media radio stations
Daytime-only radio stations in Minnesota
1966 establishments in Minnesota